Ng Yak Howe is a Malaysian politician from DAP. He has been the Member of Johor State Legislative Assembly for Bentayan since 2018.

Politics 
He was the Deputy Chief of DAPSY Johor from 2011 to 2014, Assistant Organising Secretary for DAP Johor from 2013 to 2016 and Organising Secretary for DAP Johor from 2016 to 2021. He is currently a Member of DAP Johor Committee.

Election result

External links

References 

People from Johor
National University of Malaysia alumni
Democratic Action Party (Malaysia) politicians
Members of the Johor State Legislative Assembly
Malaysian people of Chinese descent
Malaysian politicians of Chinese descent
Living people
1973 births